Jessica Grace Smith (born 18 February 1985) is a New Zealand actress, writer and director. Smith graduated from Toi Whakaari: New Zealand Drama School in 2009 with a Bachelor in Performing Arts (Acting). Smith played the role of Denny Miller on the television show Home and Away and Diona in the mini-series Spartacus: Gods of the Arena.  Smith also appeared in the films The Devil's Rock and Sione's 2: Unfinished Business.

Filmography

References

External links

1988 births
Living people
21st-century New Zealand actresses

Toi Whakaari alumni